The following is the orders, decorations, and medals given by Sultan of Terengganu. When applicable, post-nominal letters and non-hereditary titles are indicated. Order of precedence for the wearing of order insignias, decorations, and medals  Precedence:Susunan Keutamaan Darjah Kebesaran, Bintang dan Pingat Terengganu

 Orders, decorations, and medals The Most Exalted Supreme Royal Family Order of Terengganu - Darjah Utama Kerabat Diraja Terengganu Yang Amat Dihormati
 Founded by Sultan Mahmud al-Muktafi Billah Shah on 10 March 1981. 
 Limited to ruling princes and awarded in one class, Member or Ahli - D.K.T.The Most Distinguished Royal Family Order of Terengganu - Darjah Kerabat Diraja Terengganu Yang Amat Mulia
 Founded by Sultan Mizan Zainal Abidin on 6 July 2000 as a family order for members of the Trengganu and other Royal houses. 
 Awarded in one class, Member or Ahli - D.K.R.The Most Distinguished Family Order of Terengganu - Darjah Kebesaran Kerabat Terengganu Yang Amat Mulia 
 Founded by Sultan Ismail Nasiruddin Shah on 19 June 1962 as a family order for members of the Trengganu and other Royal houses. 
 Awarded in two classes :
 1. First Class Member or Ahli Yang Pertama (Max. 16 recipients at any one time) - D.K. I 
 2. Second Class Member or Ahli Yang Kedua (Max. 24 recipients) - D.K. IIThe Most Select Order of Sultan Mizan Zainal Abidin of Terengganu - Darjah Kebesaran Sultan Mizan Zainal Abidin Terengganu Yang Amat Terpilih
 Founded by Sultan Sultan Mizan Zainal Abidin on 6 July 2001
 Awarded in a supreme class, Sri Utama (established 26 May 2005) - SUMZ and four ordinary classes :
 1. Knight Grand Companion or Dato’ Sri Setia - S.S.M.Z. 
 2. Knight Companion or Dato’ Setia - D.S.M.Z.
 3. Companion or Setia - S.M.Z.
 4. Member or Ahli - A.M.Z.The Most Revered Order of Sultan Mahmud I of Terengganu - Darjah Kebesaran Sultan Mahmud I Terengganu Yang Amat Terpuji
 Founded by Sultan Mahmud al-Muktafi Billah Shah on 28 February 1982. 
 Awarded in three classes :
 1. Member Grand Companion or Ahli Sri Setia (Max. 16 recipients) - S.S.M.T.
 2. Member Knight Companion or Ahli Dato’ Setia (Max. 32 recipients) - D.S.M.T.
 3. Member Companion or Ahli Setia (Max. 60 recipients) - A.S.M.The Most Distinguished Order of the Crown of Terengganu - Darjah Kebesaran Mahkota Terengganu Yang Amat Mulia
 Founded by Sultan Ismail Nasiruddin Shah on 19 June 1962. 
 Awarded in four classes :
 1. Knight Grand Commander or Dato’ Sri Paduka (Max. 25 recipients) - S.P.M.T.
 2. Knight Commander or Dato’ Paduka (Max. 50 recipients) - D.P.M.T.
 3. Companion or Setia (Max. 100 recipients) - S.M.T.
 4. Member or Ahli (Max. 200 recipients) - A.M.T.Conspicuous Gallantry Star - Bintang Keberanian Handal
 Instituted by Sultan Mahmud al-Muktafi Billah Shah on 7 July 1981 to reward supreme acts of gallantry within the borders of the state of Trengganu or by Trengganu subjects. Limited to officers. 
 Awarded in a single class, silver star (B.K.H.).Conspicuous Gallantry Medal - Pingat Keberanian Handal
 Instituted by Sultan Ismail Nasiruddin Shah on 22 June 1951 as a reward for supreme acts of gallantry within the borders of the state of Trengganu or by Trengganu subjects. Limited to non-commissioned officers and other ranks after 1981. 
 Awarded in a single class, silver medal (P.K.H.).Distinguished Service Medal - Pingat Jasa Cemerlang
 Instituted by Sultan Mahmud al-Muktafi Billah Shah on 10 March 1981 to reward distinguished services to the state. 
 Awarded in a single class, silver medal (P.J.C.).Distinguished Conduct Medal - Pingat Pekerti Terpilih
 Instituted by Sultan Ismail Nasiruddin Shah on 22 June 1951 as a reward for acts of bravery and distinguished conduct within the borders of the state of Trengganu or by Trengganu subjects. 
 Awarded in a single class, nickel medal (P.P.T.).Meritorious Service Medal - Pingat Jasa Kebaktian
 Instituted by Sultan Ismail Nasiruddin Shah on 22 June 1951 as a reward for meritorious services to the state. 
 Awarded in a single class, bronze medal (P.J.K.).Long Service and Good Conduct Star - Bintang Kerana Lama Berjawatan dan Baik Pekerti
 Instituted by Sultan Ismail Nasiruddin Shah on 10 January 1955 as a reward for twenty-one years of continuous long service and good conduct in state service, at the level of officer or executive, or above. 
 Awarded in a single class, six pointed silver star (B.L.B.).Long Service and Good Conduct Medal - Pingat Kerana Lama Berjawatan dan Baik Pekerti
 Instituted by Sultan Ismail Nasiruddin Shah on 10 January 1955 as a reward for twenty-one years of continuous long service and good conduct in state service, at the non-executive level or below. 
 Awarded in a single class, a medal in white metal (P.L.B.).Jubilee Medal - Pingat Jubli 
 Instituted by Sultan Ismail Nasiruddin Shah to commemorate his silver jubilee in 1970. 
 Awarded in a single class, silver medal.Defence Medal - Pingat Pertahanan
 Instituted by Sultan Mahmud al-Muktafi Billah Shah in 1972 as a medal of service. 
 Awarded in a single class, silver medal.Installation Medal 1970 - Pingat Pertabalan 1970
 Instituted by Sultan Mahmud al-Muktafi Billah Shah to commemorate his installation as sultan in 1970. 
 Awarded in a single class, silver medal.Installation Medal 1998' - Pingat Pertabalan 1998''
 Instituted by Sultan Mizan Zainal Abidin to commemorate his installation as sultan in 1998. 
 Awarded in a single class, silver medal.

See also 

 Orders, decorations, and medals of the Malaysian states and federal territories#Terengganu
 List of post-nominal letters (Terengganu)

References 

 
Terengganu